Behind the Wall is a 2008 horror film directed by Paul Schneider. It stars Lindy Booth, Lawrence Dane, James Thomas in the lead roles.

The film is about a lighthouse in the town of Hinderson Bay which is haunted by an evil spirit from Katelyn's past. Once its basement is broken open, new bloodshed starts, and the horrible truth about the past is gradually unveiled.

Plot 

For several generations the Parks family lived on a quiet hillside where Katelyn's grandfather and her father were keepers to the town's lighthouse. At the age of ten, Katelyn watched her mom enter the basement in their lighthouse home where minutes later she was brutally beaten and found dying on the floor. Her father, Christopher, was arrested and convicted for the killing, and Katelyn placed in foster care out of town. The murder drove Christopher into madness and he was sentenced to a mental institution, where he later died. Katelyn never had a chance to speak to her father since that horrible night.

Twenty years later, Katelyn receives a mysterious letter which brings her back to the lighthouse home she swore she would never return to again. Maine coastal town Harrison Bay is broke, so deputy mayor Drew Cabot arranges a deal with a contractor to develop the abandoned lighthouse for tourism. Father Hendry fails to convince the town council to veto the project. The town wants to open the lighthouse back up but someone from Katelyn's foggy past warns her to stop them! What they don't tell her is "why". Katelyn is forced to confront the evil that lurks within the lighthouse when some of the developers slowly begin to disappear. What she discovers is a family secret long buried by her grandfather. She must now unearth the truth and find a way to stop the nightmare which surrounds the lighthouse.

Cast 
 Lindy Booth as Katelyn Parks
 Julia Kennedy as 8 year old Katelyn
 Lawrence Dane as Father Hendry
 James Thomas as Drew Cabot
 Andy Jones as Ray Sanders
 Brad Hodder as Eric Carrinton
 Suzie Pollard as Monica
 Jody Richardson as Triggs Herman
 Mike Daly as Christopher Parks
 Danny McLeod as Leon Ferguson
 Ruth Lawrence as Elaine
 Paul Rowe as Police Officer
 Geraldine Hollett as Tessa
 Sean Panting as Local
 Donnie Coady as Ridley Parks

References

External links 
 
 

2008 films
2008 horror films
2000s supernatural horror films
American supernatural horror films
Canadian supernatural horror films
Films set in Maine
American haunted house films
English-language Canadian films
Films directed by Paul Schneider (director)
Works set in lighthouses
2000s American films
2000s Canadian films